T3 Technion Technology Transfer is the technology transfer unit of the Technion – Israel Institute of Technology in Israel. The unit operates under the auspices of the Technion Research & Development Foundation.

Overview

T3 is staffed by an 11-member team whose focus is to commercialize new ideas in science and technology from Technion in Israel, by finding  investors and entrepreneurs to develop commercial applications. This includes licensing intellectual property and the establishment of start-up companies. The team has been described as "the private sector's gateway to Technion innovation".

As of 2011, 424 patents were granted to Technion innovations, with 845 patents pending. T3's partners include incubators, entrepreneurs, private investors, venture capitalists and angel groups. It also conducts strategic partnerships with multinational companies such as Microsoft, IBM, Intel, Philips, Johnson & Johnson, Coca-Cola, and others.

The name T3 was taken to represent the three 'Ts' in Technion Technology Transfer, and to indicate that scientific breakthrough is taken to another dimension (cubed) when developed and applied as solutions in the real world.

Since 2005, the unit has been managed by Benjamin Soffer, a lawyer who has served on the board of directors of companies including Genegraft, SLP Ltd, Regentis Biomaterials, EORD, Guide-X and Slender Medical. Soffer was special advisor to Israel's Chief Scientist at the Israeli Ministry of Industry and Trade.

Commercialization strategies
T3's strategy is to escort Technion technologies from the initial point of discovery, through the process of development and licensing, to the formation of ventures with industry. Commercialization strategies are tailored to the requirements of each venture, in order to enhance the market value and performance of Technion discoveries and increase their success in the global marketplace. This includes:
 Analysis of new inventions and concepts developed at the Technion
 Licensing technologies developed at the Technion
 Incorporation of spin-off companies based on Technion IP
 Participation in the board of directors of affiliated companies
 Negotiation and approval of the IP and business aspects of agreements with industry

Major developments
Rasagiline
Rasagiline is a drug to treat Parkinson's disease discovered by Prof. Moussa B.H. Youdim of Technion and John Finberg. It was developed in collaboration with Teva Pharmaceuticals Ltd, in Israel. Having won U.S. Food and Drug Administration approval, the drug is now marketed worldwide as Azilect.

Start-ups formed with T3 patents
 Mazor Surgical Technologies: Mazor has pioneered the development of miniature, semirobotic bone-mounted positioning systems for a range of orthopedic procedures.
 Biosense Inc.: A company that developed a 3-D cardiac mapping and navigation technology.
 FineTech: offering sophisticated chemical products and services to the pharmaceutical industry.
 Regentis Biomaterials Ltd.: a medical material development company involved in the cartilage repair market.
 Corindus Ltd.: a company providing robotic technologies for catheterizing laboratories and radiology/special procedure suites.
 Pluristem Therapeutics- engaged in the development of human placental adherent stromal cells for commercial use in disease treatment.

Examples of T3 patents
 Novel hypergolic fuel
 Source of intense coherent high-frequency radiation
 Three-dimensional video scanner
 Highly sensitive, real-time structural monitoring
 Compact direction finding antenna
 Silicon air batteries
 GeomCore - outstanding 3D graphics
 Adaptive queue management (software and algorithms)
 Tandem eletrocyte fuel cell
 Learning control scheme for hybrid vehicles

Programs

Entrepreneur in residence program
The unit runs an Entrepreneur In Residence program, in which global entrepreneurs are recruited and are given the chance to license new Technion technologies. The program normally requires a minimal amount of equity and the presentation of a business plan. As part of its effort to attract entrepreneurs, the group uses its network of venture capitalists, Incubators, head-hunting firms and service providers.

Finders
The Technion liaises with global professionals from various industries, in order to spread information about Technion innovations to potential partners.

Mentorship program
The Mentorship Program (based mainly on Technion alumni) T3 engages serial entrepreneurs as mentors to fledgling entrepreneurs/researchers. These mentors offer their experience, network  and understanding of industry and provide insights as to the preferred commercialization  route or application. The mentor is often engaged as a paid consultant supporting the  commercialization efforts,

Investment opportunities fund
The Technion has secured an internal US$10 million fund called the Technion Investment Opportunities Fund. The fund invests in syndication with other investors and aims to preserve the equity stake in Technion related companies.

Internal applicable research funds
One of the biggest challenges in technology transfer is the gap between early research products, and the level of evidence investors need to support further research. The Technion's internal applicable research funds are aimed at bridging this gap by taking promising projects beyond the proof of concept stage.

Awards
The Technion awards researchers, inventions, developments and publications from its scientists that have a profit potential. The goal of the award is to encourage entrepreneurship in research. The researchers are rated based on commercial applicability (such as potential market share), and technological maturity.

The Technion network
The American Technion Society and global Technion societies have created an international network. Many members of Technion Societies are prominent leaders in their respective fields. T3 makes every use of this international source of expertise in the service of its on-going commercialization effort.

Outsideactivities

Webinars
The Technion has initiated a webinar program aimed at presenting Technion innovation to an audience of investors, industry leaders, entrepreneurs, corporate executives, in-licensing officers and  service providers. The purpose of this program is to increase visibility and to assist in marketing and commercialization efforts.
Independently, T3 maintains an active presence in the social media on LinkedIN, Facebook and Twitter.

MBA – global patent course
This program is the result of a combined effort by the Dingman Center for Entrepreneurship at the University of Maryland, T3 and Technion's MBA program. Within this initiative, MBA students (an equal amount of Israeli and American students from Maryland University and Harvard University), collaborate on a business plan aimed at commercializing patents and technologies developed by Technion researchers. The course offers hands-on experience in commercialization and starting a company involving a real-life innovation. At the end of the course, students present their business plan to a group of seasoned venture capitalist and serial entrepreneurs.

Internal technology transfer seminars
The group conducts seminars and workshops to Technion faculty and graduate students dealing with different aspects of commercialization, e.g., patenting, entrepreneurship, finance, fund raising, licensing, company formation

Professional conferences
The members of the team presents in national and international conferences related to commercialization, licensing, and  technology transfer. These include the Israeli, European and US Biomed conferences, AUTM conferences, and Nanotechnology conferences.

AMIT
The Technion is the first university outside of the U.S. selected by Alfred E. Mann to be a part of his network of Alfred Mann Institutes (AMIs). The Alfred Mann Institute at the Technion (AMIT) was established with an endowment exceeding US$100 million.
Among the patents developed by AMIT is the electronic nose to sniff out cancer, invented by Hossam Haick

References

External links
 T3 website

Organizations with year of establishment missing
Multidisciplinary research institutes
Research institutes in Israel
Science and technology in Israel
Technion – Israel Institute of Technology